In June 2021, a flood and tornado outbreak affected the Midwestern United States, primarily the states of Illinois, Indiana, and Ohio.

Meteorological history
On June 18, afternoon heat had persisted, resulting in the creation of severe thunderstorms. However, the thunderstorms had not fully matured until later that evening, as warm air kept the thunderstorms from developing. Thereafter, severe thunderstorms originated from a boundary, after the weakening of the wam air, which led to multiple rounds of thunderstorms, which were situated by a complex of thunderstorms over Iowa.

Impact

Hail
A hail event associated with the storm complex included a 4-inch hailstone, which fell in Bridgewater, Iowa, and hail up to 1.5 inches in diameter were reported in the Quad Cities area. Large hail impacted northern fringes of Indianapolis, Indiana, with one event in which hail damaged parked cars near Castleton Square Mall. The hail event alone caused $1.9 billion in damage.

Flooding
A body was found in Bloomington, Indiana after he drove through floodwaters and drowned. One street in Bloomington was several feet underwater as other streets and cars were inundated, and as much as seven inches of rain was reported in Ellettsville, Indiana.

Thunderstorm wind gusts 

Tornado outbreak

Seven tornadoes touched down in Kentucky, Indiana, Ohio, and Illinois as a result of a severe weather outbreak that affected the Ohio Valley region. Two EF2 tornadoes caused severe damage to trees, outbuildings, power poles, and homes near Portland, Indiana and Fort Recovery, Ohio respectively. A high-end EF1 tornado struck the town of Milan, Indiana, downing numerous trees, destroying a garage, and tearing shingles, siding, and gutters from homes. Another EF1 tornado near Moores Hill, Indiana damaged two homes and downed trees. An EF1 tornado also caused roof and tree damage near Germantown, Ohio, while another EF1 tornado damaged farm buildings, crops, and trees near the town of DeLong, Illinois. Numerous reports of straight-line winds, large hail, and flooding were received as well. More than 40,000 people lost power during the storm. Numerous flash flood watches, warnings, and tornado warnings were issued in parts of Illinois, Indiana, and Ohio. Combined, the tornadoes inflicted $1.56 million in damages.

Confirmed tornadoes

Notes

References 

2021 meteorology
2021 in Illinois
2021 in Indiana
2021 in Ohio
Natural disasters in Illinois
Natural disasters in Indiana
Natural disasters in Ohio
2021 floods in the United States
June 2021 events in the United States
Floods in the United States
Tornadoes of 2021